The Liverpool Overhead Railway opened on 6 March 1893 with 2-car electric multiple units, the first to operate in the world. Each lightweight car had a  motor that took power from a third rail. In 1902, these were replaced with two  motors, which reduced the travel time. After 1945, some trains were modernised, replacing the timber body with aluminium and plywood and fitting power operated sliding doors under control of the guard. The trains were all removed from service when the railway closed in 1956. An original example was retained by the Museum of Liverpool and an example of a modernised carriage was stored at the Electric Railway Museum, Warwickshire, now closed.

Service
The Liverpool Overhead Railway was an elevated railway operating in and around the dockside of Liverpool that opened on 6 March 1893 with the first electric multiple units operating in the world. Power was provided by a third rail between the tracks and air brakes were fitted, the pressure topped up at terminus stations. In the early days, a single motor coach would run off-peak. Leather high-backed seating was provided in the first class compartment, while third class consisted of wooden seating in bays of six, with hanging straps for standees during peak times.

These newer motor cars were fitted with  motors. To meet competition from the electric tramways that offered a faster service, in 1902 the motor cars were fitted with two Dick, Kerr & Co.  motors, which reduced the travel time from end to end from 32 minutes to 20 minutes.

Originally, first and second class accommodation was provided, but after the L&YR began running over the railway in 1905 this became first and third. The conductor rail was moved from the central position to outside the running rails at the same time. The two-car trains were lengthened to three-car with additional trailers built in 1916–18. The cars were now arranged with transverse seating, the unpowered central coach was fitted with leather-covered seats for first class passengers; third class passengers had wooden seating. The motors were replaced in 1919 by  motors, and the travel time increased to 31 minutes.

In 1945–47, a three car train was modernised, replacing the timber body with aluminium and plywood and fitting power operated sliding doors under control of the guard. New trains were considered too expensive so six more trains were rebuilt. The trains were all removed from service when the railway closed in 1956. An original example was retained by the Museum of Liverpool and an example of a modernised carriage is stored at the Electric Railway Museum, Warwickshire.

Notes and references

Notes

References

Bibliography

External links

Liverpool Overhead Railway
Train-related introductions in 1893
Train-related introductions in 1916